Kehinde Nkosi Andrews (born January 1983) is a British academic and author specialising in Black Studies.

Andrews is a Professor of Black Studies in the School of Social Sciences at Birmingham City University. He is the director of the Centre for Critical Social Research, founder of the Harambee Organisation of Black Unity, and co-chair of the UK Black Studies Association. Andrews is the first black studies professor in the UK and led the establishment of the first black studies programme in Europe at Birmingham City University.

Early life and education
Andrews is of British African-Caribbean heritage. He earned a PhD. in Sociology and Cultural Studies from the University of Birmingham in 2011. His thesis was entitled Back to Black: Black Radicalism and the Supplementary School Movement.

Journalism, media appearances and personal views 
Andrews regularly appears in the media discussing issues of race and racism, colonialism and slavery, and British nationalism. He is a frequent contributor to The Guardian, and has written articles for The Independent, New Statesman, CNN, openDemocracy, and often appears as a guest on the BBC and Good Morning Britain.

In 2016, Andrews criticized universities in the United Kingdom for institutional racism, specifically a lack of diversity in students' assigned readings. The following year, Andrews spoke at the Oxford Union, arguing that British education perpetuates racism. He also gave a TEDxYouth talk in Birmingham entitled "How to Stay Radical within an Institution" exploring how Black Studies can exist within the historically racist institution of the university.

In 2018, Andrews tweeted that the sight of the flag of England stirred the same feelings in him as the sight of a Confederate Flag does for African Americans.

In 2019, Andrews took part in a debate on whether or not the West should pay reparations for slavery at Intelligence Squared. He also spoke about his book Back to Black at the John Hope Franklin Center for Interdisciplinary and International Studies at Duke University and gave a talk at Tate Liverpool on the role of Black radicalism in the United Kingdom and the United States.

That year, Andrews appeared on Good Morning Britain, where he argued that the RAF bombing of Nazi Germany constituted a war crime and equated the racial views of Winston Churchill to those of Adolf Hitler.

Andrews narrated the film The Psychosis of Whiteness, which explores race and racism through cinematic representations of the slave trade.

In July 2019, Andrews criticized the idea that prominent non-white members of the Conservative Party is automatically a good thing, saying that a "cabinet packed with ministers with brown skin wearing Tory masks represents the opposition of racial progress".

In May 2020, Andrews was a guest on Russell Brand's YouTube channel discussing racism in the aftermath of the murder of George Floyd. He was also interviewed by the Los Angeles Review of Books discussing Malcolm X and the question of violence in Black radicalism.

In August 2020, Andrews joined calls to drop "Rule, Britannia!" and "Land of Hope and Glory" from the Last Night of the Proms, saying the lyrics contained "racist propaganda from a time where Britain was the leading slave-trading nation in the world".

In June 2021, Andrews described Elizabeth II as "probably the number one symbol of white supremacy in the entire world". Following her death in September 2022, he called for the abolition of the monarchy.

Selected works

Andrews, Kehinde (2021). The New Age of Empire: How Racism and Colonialism Still Rule the World. London: Allen Lane. . OCLC.

References

External links 

 Academic Profile at Birmingham City University
 @kehinde_andrews, Professor Kehinde Andrew's Twitter
The Psychosis of Whiteness, Film Website

1983 births
Living people
Academics of Birmingham City University
Alumni of the University of Birmingham
Black British academics
Black British writers
British people of Jamaican descent